The 1937 All-Ireland Senior Camogie Championship Final was the sixth All-Ireland Final and the deciding match of the 1937 All-Ireland Senior Camogie Championship, an inter-county camogie tournament for the top teams in Ireland.

Dublin won by a wide margin, having led 6-2 to 1-0 at half-time.

References

All-Ireland Senior Camogie Championship Final
All-Ireland Senior Camogie Championship Final, 1937
All-Ireland Senior Camogie Championship Final
All-Ireland Senior Camogie Championship Finals
Dublin county camogie team matches